In Canada, daylight saving time (DST) is observed in nine of the country's ten provinces and two of its three territories—though with exceptions in parts of several provinces and Nunavut.

Under the Canadian Constitution, laws related to timekeeping are a provincial and territorial matter. Most of Saskatchewan, despite geographically being in the Mountain Time Zone, observes year-round Central Standard Time (CST). In 2020, the Yukon Territory abandoned seasonal time change to permanently observe year-round Mountain Standard Time (MST).

In the regions of Canada where daylight saving time is used, it begins on the second Sunday of March at 2 a.m. and ends on the first Sunday in November at 2 a.m. As a result, daylight saving time lasts in Canada for a total of 34 weeks (238 days) every year, or about 65 percent of the entire year.

History
Port Arthur, Ontario (now part of Thunder Bay), was the first municipality in the world to enact daylight saving time, on July 1, 1908. (Germany later became the first country to adopt the time change, on April 30, 1916.)

Five Canadian cities, by local ordinance, subsequently used daylight saving time before 1918: Regina, Saskatchewan, on April 23, 1914; Brandon and Winnipeg, Manitoba on April 24, 1916;; Halifax, Nova Scotia on May 1, 1916; Hamilton, Ontario on June 4, 1916. St. John's, Newfoundland (now Newfoundland and Labrador), also used DST before 1918, but the province itself did not become part of Canada until 1949.

In practice, since the late 1960s, DST across Canada has been closely or completely synchronized with its observance in the United States to facilitate consistent economic and social interaction. When daylight time became standardized across the US in 1966 when Congress passed the Uniform Time Act, Canada soon followed. DST ended in October until 1986, when the end of the period was changed to November. When the United States extended DST in 1987 to the first Sunday in April, all DST-observing Canadian jurisdictions followed suit.

The latest United States change (the Energy Policy Act of 2005), adding parts of March and November to the period during which DST is observed starting in 2007, was adopted by the various provinces and territories on the following dates:
 Ontario and Manitoba – October 20, 2005
 Quebec – December 5, 2005
 Prince Edward Island – December 6, 2005
 New Brunswick – December 23, 2005
 Alberta – February 2, 2006
 Northwest Territories – March 4, 2006
 British Columbia – March 31, 2006
 Nova Scotia – April 25, 2006
 Yukon – July 14, 2006
 Newfoundland and Labrador –  November 20, 2006, but officially announced on January 18, 2007
 Nunavut – February 19, 2007
 Saskatchewan – No official action was taken as almost all of the province does not observe daylight saving time and remains on CST year-round. However, the few places in the province that do observe daylight saving (Lloydminster and the surrounding area, which straddles the Alberta border and observes Mountain Time; and Creighton, which observes daylight saving on an unofficial basis due to its proximity to the border with Manitoba) follow the aforementioned March–November schedule just like the rest of the country.

By province and territory
The provinces and territories that observe DST in Canada include:

 Alberta
 British Columbia (excluding some eastern, northeastern, and southeastern regions)
 Manitoba
 New Brunswick
 Newfoundland and Labrador
 Northwest Territories
 Nova Scotia
 Nunavut (excluding Southampton Island)
 Ontario (excluding some northwestern regions)
 Prince Edward Island
 Quebec (excluding eastern Quebec)
 Some parts in eastern and western Saskatchewan

Atlantic Canada
In 2022, the premiers of New Brunswick, Newfoundland and Labrador, Prince Edward Island, and Nova Scotia discussed the possibility of adopting permanent daylight time. Their discussion followed the United States Senate passing the Sunshine Protection Act to make DST permanent, with a target date of November 2023.

British Columbia
Most of British Columbia (BC) is on Pacific Time and observes DST. However, there are two main exceptions:

 Part of the Peace River Regional District (including the communities of Chetwynd, Dawson Creek, Hudson's Hope, Fort St. John, Taylor and Tumbler Ridge) is on Mountain Time and does not observe DST. This means that the region's clocks match those in Calgary and Edmonton in the winter, and match those in Vancouver in the summer. In 2014, the residents of Fort Nelson voted to stay on MST year-round also, which the community has observed since 2015.
 The East Kootenay region in southeastern British Columbia (including the communities of Cranbrook, Fernie, Sparwood, Golden and Invermere) is on Mountain Time and observes DST. This means that time in the region always matches that of Calgary; much of the region gets television by way of re-broadcasters of Calgary stations. One exception in this region is Creston, which observes MST year-round. Clocks in Creston match those in Calgary in the winter and Vancouver in the summer.
On March 31, 2006, British Columbia added parts of March and November to its daylight saving period, following the United States' Energy Policy Act of 2005.

Manitoba 
Time in Manitoba, all of which runs on Central Time, is dictated by the province's Official Time Act.

In 1916, Brandon and Winnipeg became two of seven cities in Canada to use daylight saving time before 1918, by local ordinance. On October 20, 2005, Manitoba added parts of March and November to its daylight saving period, following the United States' Energy Policy Act of 2005.

Nunavut

The territory of Nunavut comprises three time zones: Mountain Time in the west, Central Time in the centre and Eastern Time in the east. Daylight saving time is observed throughout Nunavut with the exception of Southampton Island, including Coral Harbour, and Eureka—a permanent research station on Ellesmere Island—both of which remain on Eastern Standard Time throughout the year.

On February 19, 2007, Nunavut added parts of March and November to its daylight saving period, following the United States' Energy Policy Act of 2005.

Ontario
Most of Ontario uses DST. Pickle Lake, Atikokan, and New Osnaburghthree communities located within the Central Time Zone in northwestern Ontarioobserve Eastern Standard Time year-round.

Ontario was the site of the first municipality in the world to enact DST: Port Arthur on July 1, 1908. Similarly, Hamilton subsequently became one of seven cities in Canada to use daylight saving time before 1918, by local ordinance.

On October 20, 2005, Ontario added parts of March and November to its daylight saving period, following the United States' Energy Policy Act of 2005. In November 2020, the Legislative Assembly of Ontario passed Bill 214, the Time Amendment Act, 2020, which will establish year-round observation of daylight saving time; however, the act does not come into force immediately; instead, it takes effect on a day to be named by proclamation of the Ontario lieutenant governor under the advisory of the province's attorney general. This is intended to avoid moving to a different time zone than that used in Quebec or New York.

Quebec
Most of Quebec is on Eastern Time and observes DST. However, there are three exceptions, all of which are legally accommodated by the province's Time Act of 2006:
The Magdalen Islands are on Atlantic Time and observe DST.
The Listuguj Reserve is on Atlantic Time and observes DST.
Le Golfe-du-Saint-Laurent Regional County Municipality observes Atlantic Standard Time all year.
In the early 20th century, Montreal became one of seven cities in Canada to use daylight saving time before 1918, by local ordinance. On December 5, 2005, Quebec added parts of March and November to its daylight saving period, following the United States' Energy Policy Act of 2005.

Saskatchewan

Although all of Saskatchewan is geographically within the Mountain Time Zone, the province officially observes Central Time year-round. This means that clocks in most of the province match clocks in Winnipeg during the winter and Calgary and Edmonton during the summer. The Saskatchewan Time Act of 1966 designated the use of CST year-round for eastern Saskatchewan and gave local options for western parts of the province. Since 1972, all western regions of the province (except around Lloydminster) have opted to use CST year-round.

The city of Lloydminster, which is bisected by the Saskatchewan–Alberta boundary, and its immediate surrounding region, observe Mountain Time year-round, with officially sanctioned daylight saving time (which in the summer puts it in synchronization with the rest of Saskatchewan). This is to keep clocks on the Saskatchewan side in synchronization with those on the Alberta side; Alberta mandates the use of daylight saving time province-wide. Along the Manitoba border, the small, remote Saskatchewan towns of Denare Beach and Creighton unofficially observe Central Daylight Time during the summer, thereby keeping the same time as larger neighbouring Manitoba communities.

See also
 Time in Canada
 Daylight saving time by country

References

External links
 Canadian time zone map from the Atlas of Canada
 North American time zone maps and border data, including Daylight Saving observance

 
Canada